Papiine betaherpesvirus 3 (PaHV-3) is a species of virus in the genus Cytomegalovirus, subfamily Betaherpesvirinae, family Herpesviridae, and order Herpesvirales.

References 

Betaherpesvirinae